Michel Gondry (born 8 May 1963) is a French filmmaker noted for his inventive visual style and distinctive manipulation of mise en scène. Along with Charlie Kaufman, he won an Academy Award for Best Original Screenplay as one of the writers of the 2004 film Eternal Sunshine of the Spotless Mind, a film he also directed.

His other films include the music documentary Dave Chappelle's Block Party (2005), the surrealistic science fantasy comedy The Science of Sleep (2006), the comedy Be Kind Rewind (2008), the superhero action comedy The Green Hornet (2011), the drama The We and the I (2012), and the romantic science fantasy tragedy Mood Indigo (2013).

He has directed music video for Daft Punk, Donald Fagen, Foo Fighters, Radiohead, Kanye West, Björk, Beck, The Chemical Brothers, Kylie Minogue, Idles, and The White Stripes.

Early life
Gondry was born in Versailles. He is the grandson of inventor Constant Martin.

Career

Gondry's vision and career began with his emphasis on emotion. Much of his inspiration, he says, came from the film Le voyage en ballon. He stated: "When I watch this movie, I dream I'm flying and then I do stories where people are flying. I think it's directly influencing."

His career as a filmmaker began with creating music videos for the French rock band Oui Oui, in which he also served as a drummer. The style of his videos for Oui Oui caught the attention of music artist Björk, who asked him to direct the video for her song "Human Behaviour". The collaboration proved long-lasting, with Gondry directing a total of eight music videos for Björk.

Other artists who have collaborated with Gondry on more than one occasion include Daft Punk, The White Stripes, The Chemical Brothers, The Vines, Steriogram, Radiohead, and Beck. Gondry's video for Lucas Secon's "Lucas with the Lid Off" was nominated in the Best Music Video (short form) category at the 37th Grammy Awards, (one of two Gondry music videos nominated that year along with Sinéad O'Connor's Fire On Babylon).

Gondry has also created numerous television commercials. He pioneered the "bullet time" technique later adapted in The Matrix in the 1996 "Smarienberg" commercial for Smirnoff vodka, as well as directing a trio of inventive holiday-themed advertisements for clothing retailer Gap.

Gondry, along with directors Spike Jonze and David Fincher, is representative of the influx of music video directors into feature film. Gondry made his feature film debut in 2001 with Human Nature, garnering mixed reviews. His second film, Eternal Sunshine of the Spotless Mind (also his second collaboration with screenwriter Charlie Kaufman), was released in 2004 and received very favorable reviews, becoming one of the most critically acclaimed films of the year.

Eternal Sunshine utilizes many of the image manipulation techniques that Gondry had experimented with in his music videos. Gondry won an Academy Award alongside Kaufman and Pierre Bismuth for the screenplay of Eternal Sunshine. The style of Gondry's music videos often relies on videography and camera tricks which play with frames of reference.

Gondry also directed the musical documentary Dave Chappelle's Block Party (2006) which followed comedian Dave Chappelle as he attempted to hold a large, free concert in the Bedford-Stuyvesant neighborhood of Brooklyn. His following film, The Science of Sleep, hit theaters in September 2006. This film stars Mexican actor Gael García Bernal, and marked a return to the fantastical, surreal techniques he employed in Eternal Sunshine.

According to the Guinness World Records 2004, Gondry's Levi's 501 Jeans "Drugstore" spot holds the record for "Most awards won by a TV commercial". The commercial was never aired in North America because of the suggestive content involving purchasing latex condoms.

He was asked by French comic duet Éric and Ramzy to direct Seuls Two, but declined; by his suggestion, Éric and Ramzy subsequently asked Mr Oizo to direct another movie, Steak.

In September 2006, Gondry made his debut as an installation artist at Deitch Projects in New York City's SoHo gallery district. The show, called "The Science of Sleep: An Exhibition of Sculpture and Pathological Creepy Little Gifts" featured props from his film, The Science of Sleep, as well as film clips and a selection of gifts that the artist had given to women he was interested in, many of them former or current collaborators, Karen Baird, Kishu Chand, Dorothy Barrick and Lauri Faggioni.

A leitmotif of the film is a 'Disastrology' calendar; Gondry commissioned the painter Baptiste Ibar to draw harrowing images of natural and human disasters.

Gondry was an Artist in Residence at the Massachusetts Institute of Technology in 2005 and 2006. Later directing the music video for the Paul McCartney song "Dance Tonight", in which Gondry makes a cameo appearance.

Gondry directed "Unnatural Love", the fifth episode in season two of HBO's Flight of the Conchords. Interior Design one third of the 2008 anthology film Tokyo! was next for Gondry. Interior Design was based on the comic book "Cecil and Jordan in New York" by Gabrielle Bell but was adapted from New York City to Tokyo for the film.

In 2009, The Thorn in the Heart, another feature documentary, was released, it is about Michel's aunt Suzette and her son Jean-Yves. In 2011, Gondry directed The Green Hornet, a superhero film by Sony starring Seth Rogen, Jay Chou and Christoph Waltz; Rogen co-wrote the script. In 2011, he was the head of the jury for the short film competition at the 2011 Cannes Film Festival.

His film The We and the I was selected to be screened in the Directors' Fortnight section at the 2012 Cannes Film Festival.

On 3 January 2013, Gondry released his latest animated short Haircut Mouse on his official Vimeo channel. In February 2013, Gondry released a hand-drawn animated documentary on famed linguist Noam Chomsky, Is the Man Who is Tall Happy?.

In 2014, he was selected as a member of the jury for the 64th Berlin International Film Festival.

Gondry produced the video for Metronomy's single "Love Letters", taken from the album of the same name.

Personal life
His brother Olivier "Twist" Gondry is also a television commercial and music video director creating videos for bands such as The Stills, Hot Hot Heat, Daft Punk and The Vines. Michel's son Paul Gondry is an artist, actor, and film director as well.

Filmography

Feature films

Fiction

Documentary

Short films

Television

Other releases
The Work of Director Michel Gondry (2003)
Michel Gondry 2: More Videos (Before and After DVD 1) (2009)

Music videos

Advertisements

Bibliography
 Henry Keazor, Thorsten Wuebbena, Video Thrills The Radio Star. Musikvideos: Geschichte, Themen, Analysen. Bielefeld 2005, pp. 90, 288; 
You'll Like This Film Because You're In It (2008). PictureBox
 Markus Altmeyer, Die Filme und Musikvideos von Michel Gondry. Zwischen Surrealismus, Pop und Psychoanalyse, Marburg 2008; 
 Henry Keazor, "`Emotional Landscapes´: Die Musikvideos von Michel Gondry und Björk", in: Klanglandschaften, ed. by Manuel Gervink and Jörn Pieter Hiekel, Hofheim 2009, pp. 45–63;  
 Henry Keazor/Thorsten Wuebbena, "Introduction" and Giulia Gabrielli, "An Analysis of the Relation between Music and Image. The Contribution of Michel Gondry", in: Keazor, Henry; Wuebbena, Thorsten: Rewind, Play, Fast Forward. The Past, Present and Future of the Music Video.

References

External links

 
 
 
Le Romantique New York Times Magazine profile on Michel Gondry (09/2006)
Democracy Now! Interview Animating Noam Chomsky: French Director Michel Gondry on New Film "Is the Man Who is Tall Happy?" December 3, 2013

1963 births
Advertising directors
MTV Europe Music Award winners
Best Original Screenplay Academy Award winners
French emigrants to the United States
French film directors
French music video directors
French male screenwriters
20th-century French screenwriters
21st-century French screenwriters
Living people
People from Versailles
Writers Guild of America Award winners
English-language film directors
French-language film directors
Postmodernist filmmakers